Dimock is an unincorporated community in Susquehanna County, Pennsylvania, United States. Dimock has a post office with ZIP code 18816, which opened on April 13, 1818.

References

Unincorporated communities in Susquehanna County, Pennsylvania
Unincorporated communities in Pennsylvania